Portraits on Standards is an album by pianist and bandleader Stan Kenton with featuring performances of jazz standards recorded in 1953 and originally released on the Capitol label as a 10-inch LP.

Critical reception

The Allmusic review by Scott Yanow noted "While most of Stan Kenton's recordings in the 1950s tend to be complex and sometimes bombastic, his versions of standards could often be sentimental and very melodic" and said the music "alternates between ballads and boppish romps, mostly featuring the 1953-1954 orchestra, a band that could often swing hard".

Track listing
 "You and the Night and the Music" (Arthur Schwartz, Howard Dietz) - 2:43
 "Reverie" (Claude Debussy) - 2:56
 "I've Got You Under My Skin" (Cole Porter) - 2:53
 "Autumn in New York" (Vernon Duke) - 2:41
 "April in Paris" (Duke, Yip Harburg) - 2:53
 "How High the Moon" (Morgan Lewis, Nancy Hamilton) - 2:22
 "Crazy Rhythm" (Irving Caesar, Joseph Meyer, Roger Wolfe Kahn) - 3:02
 "I Got It Bad (and That Ain't Good)" (Duke Ellington, Paul Francis Webster) - 3:02

Personnel
Stan Kenton - piano, conductor
Conte Candoli, Buddy Childers, Don Dennis, Ernie Royal, Don Smith - trumpet
Bob Burgess, Keith Moon, Frank Rosolino, Tommy Shepard - trombone 
George Roberts - bass trombone
Don Carone, Lee Konitz - alto saxophone
Zoot Sims, Ed Wasserman - tenor saxophone
Tony Ferina - baritone saxophone
Sal Salvador  - guitar
Don Bagley - bass
Stan Levey - drums
Bill Russo - arranger

References

Stan Kenton albums
1953 albums
Capitol Records albums
Albums arranged by Bill Russo
Albums conducted by Stan Kenton
Albums produced by Sid Feller